PlateSmart Technologies is a software based license plate recognition (LPR) company based in Oldsmar, Florida. The company's camera agnostic software uses a video camera and computer to identify and record license plates via video analytics algorithms. The company employs engineers, mathematicians, video engineers, and law enforcement officers located throughout the United States. PlateSmart has an integrator in Dubai, U.A.E. called Electronic Design.

PlateSmart's main product, ARES, integrates with existing hardware to create an LPR system. This technology has been utilized by law enforcement agencies, the US Navy, the University of Miami, and NCIS.  PlateSmart also designs applications to string LPR systems together, analyze LPR data, recognize patterns and form reports for users.

PlateSmart's software is also designed to integrate with other Video Management Systems (VMS) to alter product features and capabilities. PlateSmart has partnered with the following integrators: 
 Pelco  
 Avigilon 
 Verint Systems 
 exacq Technologies 
Milestone
 OnSSI 
 Mavin Technologies 
 SureView  
 Vicon Industries

References

External links
 Official website

Automatic number plate recognition
American companies established in 2004
2004 establishments in Florida
Companies based in Pinellas County, Florida
Software companies of the United States